The 2017 Port Vila Premier League or 2017 TVL Premier League is the 23rd edition of the Port Vila Premier League, the highest tier of the Port Vila Football League.

Standings

PVFA Top Four Super League

Grand Final Qualifier

Semifinal Qualifier

Semifinal

Grand Final
Winner of the grand final qualified for the 2018 OFC Champions League and the 2017 VFF National Super League grand final.

References

External links
Vanuatu 2016/17, RSSSF.com

Port Vila Football League seasons
2017 in Oceanian association football leagues
2017–18 in Vanuatuan football
2016–17 in Vanuatuan football